The Kristo Rai Church (or Christ the King Church, from Spanish Iglesia de Cristo Rey) is a Roman Catholic church in the street Kopa Di Oru of the town of Garapan in the Northern Marianas Islands, a dependent territory of the United States in the Pacific Ocean, part of Oceania.

The parish is under the jurisdiction of the Roman Catholic Diocese of Chalan Kanoa (Dioecesis Vialembensis). It was first built by the Spanish in 1876 but was terminated by the Germans in the twentieth century church.

After World War II much of the city was destroyed and the original church had to be demolished. A new building was built between 1969 and 1970. The church dedicated to Christ the King was completed in 1978.

See also
Roman Catholic Diocese of Chalan Kanoa
Christ the King Church

References

Roman Catholic churches in the Northern Mariana Islands
Garapan
Roman Catholic churches completed in 1978
20th-century Roman Catholic church buildings in the United States